Spongiacidins are bio-active isolates of marine sponge.

Further reading

Halogen-containing alkaloids
Lactams
Guanidines
Bromoarenes